White Elephant is a 2012 Argentine drama film directed by Pablo Trapero. The film competed in the Un Certain Regard section at the 2012 Cannes Film Festival.

Plot
Two priests, the old veteran Father Julián and his new younger Belgian colleague, Father Nicolás, and the social worker Luciana, work in a villa miseria in Buenos Aires, Argentina known as Ciudad Oculta. Together they fight to resolve the issues of the neighborhood's society. Their work will have them face the clerical hierarchy, the organized crime and the repression, risking their lives defending their commitment and loyalty towards the people of the neighbourhood.

The film's title comes from the gigantic abandoned hospital that dominates the area, described by Peter Bradshaw in The Guardian as, "a deserted wreck and cathedral of poverty known as the 'white elephant' where the homeless camp and drug-dealers ply their trade."

Cast
 Ricardo Darín as Julián
 Jérémie Renier as Nicolas
 Martina Gusman as Luciana

Release

After its premiere at the 2012 Cannes Film Festival on 21 May 2012, the film went on general release in Argentina three days later. It saw a very limited release (just 1 screen) in the United States on 29 March 2013, and a more general release in the United Kingdom on 26 April 2013.

The views of the British critics were mixed. Peter Bradshaw in The Guardian found it "a flawed drama, but one with emotional power", while Philip French in the sister paper The Observer found it to be a "hard-hitting tale of Catholic priests working in the slums of Argentina [which] thrills from start to finish", and Geoffrey Macnab in The Independent found it uneven: "The problem is the melodramatic and solemn screenplay. The action sequences have an energy reminiscent of City of God but the scenes in which the priests deal with housing problems or struggle with ill health or the temptations of the flesh soon begin to drag." Tim Robey in The Daily Telegraph was more enthusiastic, calling it a "potent drama about the lawless slums of Buenos Aires – it feels like The Mission with all exoticism firmly excised."

References

External links
 

2012 films
2012 drama films
2012 independent films
Argentine drama films
Films about Catholic priests
Films directed by Pablo Trapero
French drama films
2010s French-language films
Spanish drama films
2010s Spanish-language films
Films shot in Buenos Aires
Argentine independent films
French independent films
Spanish independent films
Squatting in film
Buena Vista International films
2010s French films
2010s Argentine films